The American Hospital of Paris (Hôpital américain de Paris), founded in 1906, is a private, not-for-profit,  community hospital is certified under the French healthcare system. Located in Neuilly-sur-Seine, in the western suburbs of Paris, France, it has 187 surgical, medical, and obstetric beds.

History
The American Hospital of Paris was founded in 1906. Seven years later the United States Congress  recognized the hospital under Title 36 of the United States Code on January 30, 1913. During World War I in March 1918, the French government decreed the hospital to be "an institution of public benefit", authorizing it to receive donations. The hospital is now the only civilian hospital in Europe accredited by The Joint Commission (TJC), an independent organization that accredits hospitals in the United States; it is also accredited by France's Haute Autorité de santé (HAS). To this day, the American Hospital of Paris receives no government subsidies from either France or the United States operating solely on donations from its many international private and corporate donors.

Rock Hudson was treated at the hospital with a new drug for AIDS, a fact that was made public against his will by a hospital spokesperson.

Facilities
The hospital has an extensive Ancillary Services Department, equipped with modern diagnostic and treatment equipment. The Outpatient Consultation Department's 150 physicians cover every major medical and surgical specialty. The Emergency Department physicians provide immediate care to patients 24 hours a day, 7 days a week. The medical staff includes over 500 physicians and surgeons. These private practitioners are credentialed by the Hospital through a thorough and strict selection process.

Notable patients who have been in the hospital 
 Olive Thomas, American silent film actress and model, died on September 10, 1920
 Jack Pickford, Canadian-American actor, film director and producer, died on January 3, 1933
 Pearl White, (1889-1938), American silent film actress (most notably in The Perils of Pauline serial), died in the hospital on August 4, 1938
 Raimu, French actor, died of a heart attack in an allergic reaction to an anesthetic on September 20, 1946
 Gertrude Stein, American novelist, poet and playwright, died in the hospital on July 27, 1946
 Georges Bernanos, French writer, died in the hospital on July 5, 1948
 Prince Edouard-Xavier de Lobkowicz, French aristocrat, was born in the hospital on October 18, 1960
 Agneta Marianne Frieberg, Swedish fashion, commercial and runway model, died in the hospital on 10 May 1971
 Pierre Fresnay, French actor, died in the hospital on January 9, 1975
 Aristotle Onassis, Greek shipping magnate, died in the hospital on March 15, 1975
 Jean Gabin, French actor, died in the hospital on November 15, 1976
 Tino Rossi, French singer, died after being discharged from the hospital on September 29, 1983
 Paul Zweig, American critic, poet, memoirist, died in the hospital on August 29, 1984
 François Truffaut, French film director, died in the hospital on October 21, 1984
 Marcel Dassault, French aircraft industrialist, died in the hospital on April 17, 1986
 Bette Davis, American actress, died in the hospital on October 6, 1989
 Pamela Harriman, United States Ambassador to France, died in the hospital on February 5, 1997 
 Barbara, French singer, died in the hospital on November 24, 1997

 Jan Stenbeck, Swedish entrepreneur, one of Sweden's wealthiest individuals, died in the hospital on August 19, 2002.
 Françoise Giroud, French journalist, screenwriter, writer and politician, died in the hospital on January 19, 2003
 Philippe de Broca, French filmmaker, died in the hospital on November 26, 2004
 Annabel Buffet, Actress, writer, and singer, died in the hospital on August 3, 2005
 Angus Maddison, British economist, died in the hospital on April 24, 2010
 Robert Laffont, French publisher, died in the hospital on May 19, 2010
 Rosy Varte, French actress, died in the hospital on January 14, 2012
 Jean-Luc Delarue, French television presenter and producer, died in the hospital on August 23, 2012
 Gholamreza Pahlavi, Persian prince, died on May 7, 2017
 France Gall, French singer, died in the hospital on January 7, 2018
 Karl Lagerfeld, German creative director, fashion designer, artist, photographer and caricaturist, died in the hospital on February 19, 2019
 Joachim Yhombi-Opango, Congolese former President of the Republic of the Congo, died in the hospital from COVID-19 on March 30, 2020
 Kenzō Takada, Japanese-French fashion designer, died at the hospital from COVID-19 on 4 October 2020
 Pierre Cardin, Italian-French fashion designer, died in the hospital on December 29, 2020
 Lionel Messi, Argentinian superstar footballer, for a medical in a transfer to Paris Saint-Germain, on August 10, 2021
 Ibrahim Mbombo Njoya, Cameroonian royal and politician, died from COVID-19 in the hospital on September 27, 2021

See also

American Base Hospital No. 57

References

Further reading 
 Charles Glass, Americans in Paris: Life and Death Under Nazi Occupation, Harper Collins, U.K.

External links 
 
 The American Hospital of Paris Foundation

Hospitals in Hauts-de-Seine
Hospitals established in 1906
Patriotic and national organizations chartered by the United States Congress
1906 establishments in France